Mecyna tricolor is a moth in the family Crambidae. It was described by Arthur Gardiner Butler in 1879. It is found in Japan, Taiwan, China and Russia.

The wingspan is 22–25 mm.

References

Moths described in 1879
Spilomelinae